Gordon Ridings (c. 1907 – November 16, 1958) was an American college basketball player and coach. He served as head basketball coach at Columbia University from 1946 until 1950, when he suffered a heart attack and handed over coaching duties to Lou Rossini. Ridings graduated of University of Oregon in 1929, where he was a two-time All-Pacific Coast Conference Northern Division selection (1928, 1929). Ridings was remembered as one of the first great teachers of defensive basketball. Story has it that Red Auerbach of the Boston Celtics often came to Morningside Heights to learn how to coach defense.  Ridings died of a heart attack, on November 16, 1958, at the age of 51.

Head coaching record

References

Date of birth missing
1900s births
1958 deaths
American men's basketball coaches
American men's basketball players
Basketball coaches from Oregon
Basketball players from Oregon
Guards (basketball)
Columbia Lions men's basketball coaches
Oregon Ducks baseball players
Oregon Ducks men's basketball players
People from Clackamas County, Oregon
Sportspeople from the Portland metropolitan area